Fary Faye (born 24 December 1974), is a Senegalese former footballer who played as a striker.

He spent most of his professional career in Portugal (more than 15 years), most notably with Beira-Mar and Boavista. At one point he ranked in the country's Primeira Liga scoring list's Top 5, eventually amassing competition totals of 222 matches and 68 goals over ten seasons.

Club career
Born in Dakar, Fary began his career with ASC Diaraf in his native country, then started his Portuguese adventure in 1996, signing with lowly Grupo União Sport Montemor alongside compatriot and teammate Khadim Faye and remaining with the third division club for two seasons, before moving to S.C. Beira-Mar.

From 1998 to 2003, Fary was an ever-present fixture in the top scorer's list in Portugal, hitting an average of one goal every three games in the Primeira Liga. In the 2002–03 campaign he netted 18 times for the Aveiro team, which finished 13th.

Fary signed for Boavista F.C. in the summer of 2003, but his role gradually diminished compared to his previous spell. In 2006–07 he went scoreless in 23 appearances, although only three of those were as a starter.

In July 2008, upon Boavista's relegation to the second level, Fary returned to his first Portuguese professional club Beira-Mar, also in that tier. After appearing rarely as the team returned to the top flight in 2010 after a three-year absence – four matches, no goals – the 35-year-old joined another side in the nation, C.D. Aves.

Fary represented Boavista from 2011 to 2015, with the better part of that spell being spent in the third division. On 2 July 2015, immediately after retiring, the 40-year-old was named their new director of football.

International career
Fary was part of the Senegal squad at the 2000 African Cup of Nations which reached the quarter-finals, losing to Nigeria.

Honours

Club
Beira-Mar
Taça de Portugal: 1998–99
Segunda Liga: 2009–10

Individual
Primeira Liga Top Scorer: 2002–03

References

External links

1974 births
Living people
Footballers from Dakar
Serer sportspeople
Senegalese footballers
Association football forwards
ASC Jaraaf players
União Montemor players
Primeira Liga players
Liga Portugal 2 players
Segunda Divisão players
S.C. Beira-Mar players
Boavista F.C. players
C.D. Aves players
Senegal international footballers
2000 African Cup of Nations players
Senegalese expatriate footballers
Expatriate footballers in Portugal
Senegalese expatriate sportspeople in Portugal
Faye dynasty